Magic Mountain or The Magic Mountain may refer to:

Books
 The Magic Mountain, a novel by Thomas Mann

Places
 Magic Mountain (California), a landform that was Nike missile location LA-98R
 Magic Mountain (British Columbia), a hydrothermal vent field on the Pacific Ocean sea floor
 Magic Mountain site, a prehistoric archaeological site in Colorado
 Magic Mountain, Vermont, a natural ski area in Londonderry, Vermont
 Magic Mountain (Washington), a mountain on the border of North Cascades National Park and Snoqualmie National Forest, Washington, USA

Parks and Recreation
 Magic Mountain (roller coaster), a steel roller coaster in Castelnuovo del Garda, Italy
 Magic Mountain, Glenelg, a former theme park in Glenelg, Australia
 Magic Mountain Resort, a small ski area south of Twin Falls, Idaho
 Magic Mountain, Merimbula, a theme park in Australia
 Magic Mountain (New Brunswick), a water park in Moncton, New Brunswick
 Magic Mountain, Nobby Beach, a former theme park on the Gold Coast, Australia
 Six Flags Magic Mountain, a theme park in Valencia, California

Film and TV
 The Magic Mountain (1982 film), a film directed by Hans W. Geißendörfer
 The Magic Mountain (2015 film), a film directed by Anca Damian
 Magic Mountain (TV series), an Australian and Chinese children's programme

Music
 "Magic Mountain" (song), by Eric Burdon & War (1977)
 Magic Mountain (Hans Koller album) (1997)
 Magic Mountain (Black Stone Cherry album) (2014)
"Magic Mountain", a song by Blonde Redhead from Misery Is a Butterfly (2004)